Andrzej Świstak (born 2 June 1963) is a Polish former ice hockey player and coach. He played for Podhale Nowy Targ, Les Orques d'Anglet, Rapaces de Gap, Girondins de Bordeaux, Flammes Bleues de Reims, Aquitains de Bordeaux, Dogues de Bordeaux, Bélougas de Toulouse, Lions de Lyon, and HC Havre during his career. Świstak also played for the Polish national team at the 1992 Winter Olympics and 1992 World Championship. At the 1983 World Junior Pool B Championship in Anglet, France, Świstak defected and remained in France. After his playing career he turned to coaching.

References

External links
 

1963 births
Living people
Anglet Hormadi Élite players
Boxers de Bordeaux players
Ice hockey players at the 1992 Winter Olympics
LHC Les Lions players
Naprzód Janów players
Olympic ice hockey players of Poland
People from Nowy Targ
Podhale Nowy Targ players
Polish defectors
Polish emigrants to France
Polish ice hockey coaches
Polish ice hockey forwards
Rapaces de Gap players
Hockey Club de Reims players